The Shriram Capital P.L. Reddy Memorial Challenger is a professional tennis tournament played on outdoor hard courts. It is currently part of the ATP Challenger Tour. It is held annually at the SDAT Tennis Stadium in Chennai, India since 2014.

Past finals

Singles

Doubles

References 

 
ATP Challenger Tour
Hard court tennis tournaments
Tennis tournaments in India
Sports competitions in Chennai